Little Mother (German: Kleine Mutti) is a 1935 Austrian-Hungarian comedy film directed by Henry Koster and starring Franciska Gaal, Friedrich Benfer and Otto Wallburg. The film was made by a local subsidiary of the American Universal Pictures. The rights were later acquired by RKO who remade it in English as Bachelor Mother starring Ginger Rogers and David Niven.

Synopsis
After a girl discovers a deserted baby, it is widely assumed that she is the mother.

Cast
 Franciska Gaal as Marie Bonnard
 Friedrich Benfer as Alexander Berkhoff
 Otto Wallburg as Max Berkhoff
 Ernő Verebes as Servant
 Annie Rosar as Annette
 Charles Puffy as Auctionary
 Sigurd Lohde as Dr. Ellard
 Rudolf Carl as Abteilungsdirektor
 Hermine Sterler as Leontine
 Auguste Pünkösdy as Vorsteherin
 Richard Eybner as Philips
 Babette Devrient as ältere Dame
 Felix Dombrowsky as Portier
 Mihail Xantho as Hoteldirektor
 Helene Lauterböck as Schwester
 Jaro Fürth as Lehrer
 Otto Ambros as Verkäfer
 Hanns Waschatko as Bankvorsteher
 Arthur von Duniecki as Oberkellner
 Bandi as Ein Baby

References

Bibliography
 Jewell, Richard B. RKO Radio Pictures: A Titan Is Born. University of California Press, 2012.

External links
 

1935 films
1935 comedy films
Hungarian comedy films
Austrian comedy films
1930s German-language films
Films directed by Henry Koster
Films produced by Joe Pasternak
Austrian black-and-white films
Hungarian black-and-white films
Universal Pictures films